The Pelican is a 1973 French drama film directed by and starring Gérard Blain. It was entered into the 24th Berlin International Film Festival.

Plot
As a jazz pianist, Paul Boyer (Gérard Blain) has lots of free time during the day. He spends those days with his son Marc, until he realizes that he is broke. Because of his nagging wife, Paul takes a chance on running counterfeit dollars to New York for a hefty profit. He gets caught, and spends nine years in New York prison. When he released, he returns to his home, only to find out that his wife is remarried to a wealthy man, and his rights as a father are revoked. Paul, who yearns to get his wife and son back, will do anything to be reunited with his family.

Cast
Gérard Blain as Paul
Régis Blain as 2-year-old Marc
César Chauveau as 10-year-old Marc
Dominique Ravix as Isabelle
Julie Ravix
Daniel Sarky as Cazenave
Stephen Angus as Boy riding Rollercoaster (uncredited)

References

External links

1973 films
1973 drama films
French drama films
1970s French-language films
Films directed by Gérard Blain
1970s French films